Edwin Bateman (1880-1963) was an English bowls player who competed at the Commonwealth Games.

Bowls career
He participated in the 1954 British Empire and Commonwealth Games at Vancouver, British Columbia, Canada in the pairs event finishing 10th.

Personal life
He was a Master Dairyman and company director by trade and lived in Granby and West Bridgeforth, Nottinghamshire.

References

English male bowls players
Bowls players at the 1954 British Empire and Commonwealth Games
1880 births
1963 deaths
Commonwealth Games competitors for England